North Carolina's 90th House district is one of 120 districts in the North Carolina House of Representatives. It has been represented by Republican Sarah Stevens since 2009.

Geography
Since 2023, the district has included all of Surry County, as well as part of Wilkes County. The district overlaps with the 36th Senate district.

District officeholders

Election results

2022

2020

2018

2016

2014

2012

2010

2008

2006

2004

2002

2000

References

North Carolina House districts
Surry County, North Carolina
Wilkes County, North Carolina